Mickey Russell is a former American football quarterback who played on season with the Dallas Texans of the Arena Football League. He played college football at Angelo State University.

References

External links
Just Sports Stats

Living people
Year of birth missing (living people)
American football quarterbacks
African-American players of American football
Angelo State Rams football players
Dallas Texans (Arena) players
21st-century African-American people